Madurai Narasimha Achary Rajam or M. N. Rajam is an Indian actress, who works mainly in Tamil cinema. She made her stage acting debut at the age of seven, and movie acting debut as a child artist in 1949. At the age of 14, Rajam played the vamp role in the Tamil classic Ratha Kanneer (1954), opposite M. R. Radha. Since then Rajam had acted with several leading actors including MGR, Sivaji Ganesan, Gemini Ganesan, M. R. Radha, S.S. Rajendran, M. N. Nambiar and N. S. Krishnan. She married popular Tamil playback singer A. L. Raghavan on 2 May 1960. Her performances in films like, Rathak Kaneer, Pennin Perumai, Pudhayal, Thanga Padumai, "Nadodi Mannan", "Pasa Malar", Thaali Bhagyam and "Arangetram" were critically acclaimed. She played supporting roles in films since 1970 to 1990. She started working in TV serials from 1995 and continues to work in films till 2014.

Filmography
1940s

1950s

1960s

1970s

1980s

1990s

2000s

References

Living people
Indian film actresses
Indian television actresses
1940 births
Actresses in Tamil cinema
20th-century Indian actresses
21st-century Indian actresses
Child actresses in Tamil cinema